Grewia flava, the brandy bush, wild currant, velvet raisin, or raisin tree, is a species of flowering plant in the family Malvaceae, native to southern Africa. A common shrub species, it is spreading into grasslands due to human rangeland management practices, and increasing rainfall. The berries are sweet and edible, but have little flesh and so are typically collected to ferment into alcoholic beverages. The desert truffle Kalaharituber pfeilii is often found in association with its roots.

References

flava
Flora of Angola
Flora of Zimbabwe
Flora of Southern Africa
Plants described in 1813